The Palaui Island Protected Landscape and Seascape is an island that is a protected area and national park in the municipality of Santa Ana in Cagayan, Philippines. It is located off the northeastern extremity of Luzon Island.

Geography

Palaui Island lies off the northwestern part of a large promontory in San Vicente, in the municipality of Santa Ana, Cagayan province. The Dos Hermanos rocky islets lie off Cape Engaño, in the northern point of Palaui, and there are some rocks off the northeast point of the island, about  eastward of the cape. Gran Laja island, a low rock islet surrounded by breakers, is one of the rocks located northeast off Palaui.

At the southwest end of Palaui Island is Puerto Point, a high, wooded bluff. East of the point and south of Palaui is Rona Island, a low, wooded island with a white base of sand and rocks.  Escucha Island is a high and wooded islet east of Palaui, and beyond Rona Island when seen from southwestward through the channel between Palaui Island and the mainland, where a few more islets are located.

Flora and fauna

Palaui Island is a sanctuary for 90 migratory birds.

Tourism

Among the destinations in the Palaui is the northern point of the island is the Cape Engaño Lighthouse which is situated at Cape Engaño the northern point of the island and its beaches. The island is the tenth entry in CNN's World's 100 Best Beaches list which was published on May 13, which remarked the island's "raw beauty"

On June 22, 2018, the Palaui Island Protected Landscape and Seascape was designated a national park through the Expanded National Integrated Protected Areas System (ENIPAS) Act or Republic Act No. 11038. In January 2019, the island won the Association of Southeast Asian Nations (ASEAN) Community-Based Tourism Award for 2019-2021 "for promoting sustainable tourism through the efforts of the island’s environmental group, the Palaui Environmental Protectors Association (PEPA)".

Transportation
The Port of San Vicente in the Cagayan mainland serves residents and tourist going to or departing from Palaui Island. Docking areas in Palaui is Punta Verde and the coastline of Engaño Cove.

In popular culture 
In 2013, it was used as the filming location for Survivor: Blood vs. Water and Survivor: Cagayan.

See also
 List of islands of the Philippines
 List of protected areas of the Philippines

References

Islands of Cagayan
Tourist attractions in Cagayan
Beaches of the Philippines
Marine reserves of the Philippines
National parks of the Philippines